Woolwich Dockyard railway station is in Woolwich in the Royal Borough of Greenwich. The station and all trains serving it are operated by Southeastern. It is in Travelcard Zone 3. It takes its name from the former Woolwich Dockyard.

Services 

The typical off-peak service in trains per hour is:
 4 tph to London Cannon Street (2 of these run via  and 2 run via )
 2 tph to 

During the peak hours, the station is served by an additional half-hourly circular service to and from London Cannon Street via  and Lewisham in the clockwise direction and via Greenwich in the anticlockwise direction.

Connections 
London Buses routes 161, 177, 180, 380, 472 and night route N1 serve the station.

References

External links 

Railway stations in the Royal Borough of Greenwich
Former South Eastern Railway (UK) stations
Railway stations in Great Britain opened in 1849
Railway stations served by Southeastern
Woolwich
1849 establishments in England